Lover's Acid is the third studio album by techno artist Luke Vibert under his own name. It was released in 2005 on Planet Mu.

Critical reception
Mark Richardson of Pitchfork gave the album a 7.5 of 10, commenting that Lover's Acid "reveals Vibert as a producer with a keen sense of musical humor and an abiding interest in funkiness". Mike Schiller of PopMatters gave the album four stars out of 10, saying, "The 12 tracks of Lover's Acid would have been better left as vinyl-only collector's items, for at least then, they would have carried with them some intrinsic value".

Track listing

References

External links
 

2005 albums
Luke Vibert albums
Planet Mu albums
Acid techno albums
Experimental techno albums